Gersenji (1513-1549)  (Mongolian: Гэрсэнз жалайр хунтайж) (also known as Gersenji Jalair Khongtaiji) - alternately Geressandsa (Geressandsa Jelair Khuntaidshi) - was the 11th and youngest son of Dayan Khan and the second son with Jimsgene khatun. A descendant of the Jalayir tribe, Gersenji was named by his father as chief of the Khalkha Mongol tümen in northern Mongolia, which he ruled from the 1510s until his death in 1549.

Biography
Before his death, Dayan Khan bestowed the six tümens of eastern Mongolia to his eleven sons. His youngest son Gersenji Jalair Khongtaiji received the Khalkha tümen of northern Mongolia, the largest and strongest of the six tümens and the heartland and birthplace of the Mongol empire,  while his brothers received tümens in southern Mongolia. In the middle of the sixteenth century, each of Gersenji's seven sons received as his inheritance a specific part of Khalkha Mongolia. They went on to form the houses of Tüsheet Khan, Zasagt Khan and Setsen Khan.

Family
 Father: Dayan khan
 Mother: Jimsgene khatun
 Wife: Khatungghai of Uriankhan  Möngküi khatun of Uriankhan
 Son: 
 Ashikha darkhan khongtaiji  (Descents from lords of the house of Zasagt khan aimag) 
Noyantai khatunbaatar 
Onokhui üizen noyan  (Descents from lords of the house of Tüsheet Khan, forming the house of Sain Noyon Khan) 
Amindural noyan  (Descents from lords of the house of Setsen Khan aimag)
Dari taiji 
Daldan khundulen noyan 
Samu Buima noyan

References

Borjigin
History of Mongolia
1513 births
1549 deaths